Vanitrochus is a genus of sea snails, marine gastropod mollusks in the family Trochidae, the top snails.

Distribution
This marine genus occurs in the Gulf of Oman, Persian Gulf; in the Indian Ocean off Pakistan, Sri Lanka; in the Pacific Ocean off the Loyalty Islands, Tuvalu, New Caledonia and off Australia (Queensland)

Species
Species within the genus Vanitrochus include:
 Vanitrochus geertsi Poppe, Tagaro & Dekker, 2006
 Vanitrochus padangensis (Thiele, 1925)
 Vanitrochus semiustus (Fischer, 1879)
 Vanitrochus tragema (Melvill & Standen, 1896)
Species brought into synonymy
 Vanitrochus holdsworthiana Nevill, G. & H. Nevill, 1871: synonym of Pseudominolia musiva (Gould, A.A., 1861)

References

 Pilsbry, 1889 [Manual of conchology, ser. 1, 11: 197; Invalid: Junior homonym of Conotrochus Schröter, 1863 [Cnidaria]; 
 Wilson, B., 1993. Australian Marine Shells. Prosobranch Gastropods. Odyssey Publishing, Kallaroo, WA

External links
 Iredale, 1929 (Memoirs of the Queensland Museum, 9(3): 272; Used as a substitute name for Conotrochus Pilsbry, 1889, non Schröter, 1863 (Cnidaria), but Solariella tragema Melvill & Standen, 1896 was not a species originally included in Conotrochus.

 
Trochidae
Gastropod genera